The Fløyfjell Tunnel is a road tunnel in the city of Bergen in Vestland county, Norway. The tunnel goes through the Fløyfjellet mountain massif between the city neighborhoods of Sandviken and Kalfaret.  The tunnel was built to provide a fast route around the city centre.

The twin-tube tunnel was built in the late 1980s as part of the city's motorway network, and is part of the main route between the borough of Åsane and the rest of the city. Each of the tubes carries two lanes of traffic on the European route E39/European route E16.

The traffic through the tunnel is increasing rapidly. In 2007, the average daily traffic was 41,707 vehicles, up from 34,779 vehicles in 2000. The speed cameras in the tunnel detected this section of road to have the most speeding vehicles in all of Vestland county.

Incidents
The Fløyfjell Tunnel has been named the most-frequently closed tunnel in Bergen. During 2010 for example, it was closed a total of 216 times.

In July 2011, a car crash occurred inside the Fløyfjell Tunnel. A man was driving the car south when he crashed into the mountain wall, suffering only minor injuries. The local police were notified by witnesses and arrived promptly, and subsequently closed the tunnel. It remained closed for several days, causing a problem for local residents.

References

Road tunnels in Bergen
European route E39 in Norway
1988 establishments in Norway
European route E16 in Norway
Tunnels completed in 1988